Brian Taylor (born 9 January 1955) is a former political editor for BBC Scotland and columnist for the Scottish broadsheet newspaper The Herald. Taylor – who joined the BBC in 1985 – originally co-presented Left, Right and Centre and was political correspondent prior to his political editor role. He covered politics on television beginning from the 1979 United Kingdom general election.

In 2009, he presented Holyrood and the Search for Scotland's Soul, a documentary by BBC Scotland Investigates to mark the 10th anniversary of the devolved Scottish Parliament.

Early life
Taylor attended the independent High School of Dundee and graduated from the University of St Andrews in 1977 with an MA (Hons) degree in English. Following his graduation, Taylor was employed as a journalist by the Aberdeen-based Press & Journal before a six-year spell as a lobby correspondent at Westminster.

Career
Taylor joined the BBC in 1985, co-presenting the BBC Scotland political programme Left, Right and Centre with Kirsty Wark, and presenting Good Morning Scotland. Following this, he was appointed political correspondent and then political editor in 1991.

Taylor has written two books on Scotland's new Parliament: The Scottish Parliament (Polygon, Edinburgh University Press, 1999), an account of the road to devolution and its consequences; and Scotland's Parliament: Triumph and Disaster (Edinburgh University Press, November 2002), analysing the early years of the new Parliament.

On the 10 September 2020 it was announced that he would retire at the end of October. Glenn Campbell took over in his political editor role the following year.

In February 2021 it was announced that Taylor had controversially joined The Herald as a columnist.

Personal life
Taylor is married with two sons.

Taylor is a keen Dundee United football supporter and attends games regularly. He has presented the club's inaugural Hall of Fame dinner on a number of occasions.

He was awarded an honorary degree by Abertay University in 2010.

Taylor joined Twitter in 2012 and did not tweet anything until 2020 after he retired from BBC Scotland. His lack of tweets made him a Twitter icon who people regularly joke has said something outrageous then deleted it.

References

External links
 Brian Taylor. Political editor, Scotland on BBC
 

1955 births
Living people
Journalists from Dundee
People educated at the High School of Dundee
Alumni of the University of St Andrews
BBC Scotland newsreaders and journalists
Scottish bloggers
Scottish political journalists
Scottish television journalists
Scottish editors
Scottish political writers